The Penske PC-15 is a CART open-wheel race car, designed by Penske Racing, which was constructed for competition in the 1986 season.

References

Racing cars
American Championship racing cars